Daniel Kabiljo (6 March 1894, Sarajevo – 1944, Jasenovac concentration camp) was a Yugoslav Jewish Sephardi artist. His lithographs of Sephardi life were published in 1924 but the originals are lost.

His art was featured in a propaganda film made by the Ustashe which also featured sculptor Slavko Brill. The group of artists also included Daniel Ozmo one of the younger generation of Sarajevo’s Sephardic artists.

Surviving paintings
Some of Kabiljo's surviving works are on public display: 
An Old House, oil painting, 1930s. National Gallery of Bosnia and Herzegovina, Sarajevo:
Jewish Women in Sarajevo, Jewish Historical Museum, Belgrade
The Old Sephardic Woman on The Market, oil, 1935, City Museum of Sarajevo
The Conversation, oil, 1930s, City Museum of Sarajevo
From the Outskirts of Sarajevo, oil on canvas, 1920s-1930s, National Gallery of Bosnia and Herzegovina
A Street in Sarajevo, colored linocut, 1920s-1930s, National Gallery of Bosnia and Herzegovina
A Street in Sarajevo, India ink on paper, 1920s-1930s, National Gallery of Bosnia and Herzegovina, Sarajevo

Others are held in private collections:
A Street in Sarajevo, colored linocut, 1937
Motifs from Sarajevo's Old Turkish Market, the Baščaršija, 1930s

See also
Bosnia and Herzegovina art#Art in Austro-Hungarian Period

References

External links
Gallery
Mirjam Rajner Between Local and Universal: Daniel Kabiljo, a Sephardi artist in Sarajevo on the Eve of the Holocaust pdf

1894 births
1944 deaths
Artists from Sarajevo
People from the Condominium of Bosnia and Herzegovina
Yugoslav Jews
Yugoslav painters
People who died in Jasenovac concentration camp
Sephardi Jews who died in the Holocaust
Bosnia and Herzegovina Sephardi Jews